Santa Cruz District is one of five districts of the province Palpa in Peru. A large Pre-Comlumbian archaeological site called the Lost City of Huayuri is located in the district.

Tourism 
The Santa Cruz District is a common destination for hikers, interested in Punta Union (peak) and Cordillera Blanca. The hiking tracks offer an elevation of up to 4,760 meters above sea level. The majority of the trekking companies are located in Huaraz, one of the biggest towns in the Peruvian Andes. The 4 and 5-day passing treks are in the Andes are considered one of the most beautiful in South America.

References

1953 establishments in Peru
States and territories established in 1953